WNWX (96.5 FM) is a radio station licensed to serve the community of Rhinelander, Wisconsin. The station is owned by Heartland Communications Group, through licensee Heartland Comm. License, LLC. It airs a hot adult contemporary format. WNWX shares studios with its sister station WCYE on West Davenport Street in Downtown Rhinelander, and has transmitter facilities in Starks alongside NBC station WJFW-TV (channel 12).

The station was assigned the call sign WHOH by the Federal Communications Commission on August 31, 2012. The station changed its call sign to WNWX on April 1, 2019.

References

External links
Official Website

FCC Public Inspection File for WNWX

NWX
Radio stations established in 2014
2014 establishments in the United States
Hot adult contemporary radio stations in the United States
Oneida County, Wisconsin